The two  were protected cruisers operated by the Imperial Japanese Navy. While more lightly armed and armored than many of its contemporaries, their small size and relatively simple design facilitated their construction and their relatively high speed made them useful for many military operations. Both participated in combat during the Russo-Japanese War and World War I.

Background
The Suma-class cruisers were designed and built in Japan at the Yokosuka Naval Arsenal, as part of an Imperial Japanese Navy program to end its dependence on foreign powers for modern warships, using an all-Japanese design and all-Japanese materials. However, her construction gave Japanese designers and shipbuilders valuable experience which was applied to her sister ship Akashi and which was applied in designs for larger and more powerful vessels in the future.

Design
The overall dimensions and layout of armaments on the Suma-class cruisers was almost the same as on Akitsushima. The design incorporated an all-steel, double-bottomed hull, with an armored deck, divided underneath by watertight bulkheads.

Her main battery consisted of two QF 6 inch /40 naval guns, one set in the forecastle and one in the stern. Secondary armament consisted of six QF 4.7 inch Gun Mk I–IV mounted in sponsons on the upper deck. She also was equipped with two  torpedoes, mounted on the deck .

The Suma-class cruisers were slightly smaller in displacement than Akitsushima, and consequently had lighter weaponry (two six-inch guns instead of four) to reduce issues with weight and design lessons learned with Akitsushima (such as the need to locate the secondary battery lower to the center of gravity to improve stability were implemented. Nevertheless, as with most Japanese designs of the period, the design remained top-heavy and had issues with seaworthiness and stability.

The second ship of the class, Akashi differed from Suma in that its torpedo launch tubes were moved from the bow to the rear of the ship, and had a high foremast with a radio antenna. On Akashi the fighting top was eliminated from the mast from the start, resulting in a sleeker, "more modern" design. This was also eliminated from Suma at a later date.

Ships in class

Ordered in 1891, launched 9 March 1895, and completed 12 December 1896, Suma served in the Boxer Rebellion and in the Russo-Japanese War. She also served patrol duty during World War I primarily in the Southeast Asia theater. She was removed from the navy list on 4 April 1923, and scrapped in 1928.

Ordered in 1893, launched 18 December 1897 and completed 30 March 1899, Akashi was plagued in its early career with numerous problems with its engines, especially its boilers. Once these issues were resolved, she served in the Boxer Rebellion and in the Russo-Japanese War. In World War I, Akashi served in the Battle of Tsingtao, and subsequently patrolled the sea lanes in Southeast Asia and the Mediterranean Sea. She was based out of Malta as flagship of a destroyer group as part of Japan's assistance to the Royal Navy under the Anglo-Japanese Alliance. She was expended as a target for dive bombers south of Izu Ōshima on 3 August 1930.

Notes

References
 
 
 
 
 
 
 

Cruiser classes